Carl Binder (born August 10, 1960) is a Canadian television writer and producer. He is most noted for his contributions to the Stargate SG-1 and Stargate Atlantis series as well as Dr. Quinn, Medicine Woman and Little Men.

Binder currently resides in Vancouver, British Columbia.

Career
Binder, who hails from Ontario, has worked extensively in television since the mid-1980s. He helped write the 1995 Disney animated movie, Pocahontas. Binder was set to co-write the third Stargate SG-1 movie with Brad Wright and served as an executive producer for the Stargate series Stargate Universe. More recently, he worked on Transporter: The Series, Houdini and Doyle and the miniseries Unspeakable.

Trivia
In the Stargate Atlantis episode 5x16, a hall in a secret scientific facility was called "Carl Binder Memorial Theater".

List of Stargate episodes written by Binder

Stargate SG-1

Stargate Atlantis

Stargate Universe

References

External links

1960 births
Living people
Canadian television producers
Canadian science fiction writers
Canadian male screenwriters
Canadian male television writers
Writers from Windsor, Ontario